Genter is a surname of unknown origin. Notable people with the surname include:

 Frances A. Genter, (1898–1992), American racehorse owner 
 Julie Anne Genter, (born 1979), New Zealand politician 
 Steve Genter (born 1951), American swimmer

See also